The Catholic Relief Act 1829, also known as the Catholic Emancipation Act 1829, was passed by the Parliament of the United Kingdom in 1829. It was the culmination of the process of Catholic emancipation throughout the United Kingdom of Great Britain and Ireland. 

In Ireland, it repealed the Test Act 1672 and the remaining Penal Laws which had been in force since the passing of the Disenfranchising Act of the Irish Parliament of 1728. Its passage followed a vigorous campaign led by Irish lawyer Daniel O'Connell that threatened insurrection. The British prime minister, the Duke of Wellington, and the home secretary, Robert Peel, although initially opposed, accepted the need for it to avoid civil strife. 

The act permitted members of the Catholic Church to sit in the parliament at Westminster. O'Connell had won a seat in a by-election for Clare in 1828 against an Anglican. Under the extant penal law, O'Connell, as a Catholic, was forbidden to take his seat in Parliament. 

Peel, the Home Secretary, until then had been called "Orange Peel" because he always supported the Orange (anti-Catholic) position. Peel now concluded: "though emancipation was a great danger, civil strife was a greater danger." Fearing a revolution in Ireland, Peel drew up the Catholic Relief Bill and guided it through the House of Commons. 

To overcome the vehement opposition of both the House of Lords and King George IV, the Duke of Wellington worked tirelessly to ensure passage in the House of Lords, and threatened to resign as prime minister if the king did not give royal assent.

Agitation
The campaign for Roman Catholic emancipation in Ireland was led during the years of 1828 and 1829 by Daniel O'Connell (1775–1847), organiser of the Catholic Association, but many others were active as well, both for and against.

As Lord Lieutenant of Ireland from 1822 to 1828, the Marquess Wellesley (brother of the Duke of Wellington) played a critical role in setting the stage for the Roman Catholic Emancipation Bill. His policy was one of reconciliation that sought to have the civil rights of Roman Catholics restored while preserving those rights and considerations important to Protestants. He used force in securing law and order when riots threatened the peace, and he discouraged the public agitation of both the Protestant Orange Order and the Roman Catholic Society of Ribbonmen.

Bishop John Milner was an English Roman Catholic cleric and writer highly active in promoting Roman Catholic emancipation until his death in 1826. He was a leader in anti-Enlightenment thought and had a significant influence in England as well as Ireland, and was involved in shaping the Roman Catholic response to earlier efforts in Parliament to enact Roman Catholic emancipation measures.

Meanwhile, Ulster Protestants mobilised, after a delayed start, to stop emancipation. By late 1828, Protestants of all classes began to organise after the arrival of O'Connellite Jack Lawless, who planned a series of pro-emancipation meetings and activities across Ulster. His move galvanised the Protestants to form clubs, distribute pamphlets and set up petition drives. However the Protestant protests were not well funded or coordinated and lacked critical support from the British government. 

After Roman Catholic relief had been granted, the Protestant opposition divided along class lines. The aristocracy and gentry became quiescent while the middle and working classes celebrated Protestant dominance over Ulster's Catholics through Orange parades.

Compromise
The Parliamentary Elections (Ireland) Act 1829 (10 Geo. IV, c. 8), which accompanied emancipation and received its royal assent on the same day, was the only major 'security' eventually required for it. This Act disenfranchised the minor landholders of Ireland, the so-called Forty Shilling Freeholders, and raised fivefold the economic qualifications for voting. Starting in the initial relief granting the vote by the Irish Parliament in 1793, any man renting or owning land worth at least forty shillings (two pounds sterling) had been permitted to vote. Under the Act, this was raised to ten pounds.

The act also forbade the use of the episcopal titles already used by the Church of England (10 Geo. 4 c. 7, s. 24). It imposed a penalty of £100 on "any person, not authorised by law, who should assume the title of any archbishop, bishop or dean" and extended the provisions to the "assumption of ecclesiastical titles derived from any city, town, or place in England and Ireland, not being in an existing see". This was reinforced with the Ecclesiastical Titles Act 1851, which threatened confiscation of property of anyone outside the "united Church of England and Ireland" who used any episcopal title "of any city, town or place, or of any territory or district (under any designation or description whatsoever), in the United Kingdom". The 1851 act was never enforced and was repealed in 1871. The other impositions in the act, such as prohibitions against admittance to Catholic religious orders and public processions, were repealed with the Roman Catholic Relief Act of 1926.

Political results
J. C. D. Clark (1985) depicts England before 1828 as a nation in which the vast majority of the people believed in the divine right of kings, and the legitimacy of a hereditary nobility, and in the rights and privileges of the Anglican Church. In Clark's interpretation, the system remained virtually intact until it suddenly collapsed in 1828, because Catholic emancipation undermined its central symbolic prop, the Anglican supremacy. Clark argues that the consequences were enormous: "The shattering of a whole social order. ... What was lost at that point ... was not merely a constitutional arrangement, but the intellectual ascendancy of a worldview, the cultural hegemony of the old elite." 

Clark's interpretation has been widely debated in the scholarly literature, and almost every historian who has examined the issue has highlighted the substantial amount of continuity before and after the period of 1828 through 1832.

Eric J. Evans (1996) emphasises that the political importance of emancipation was that it split the anti-reformers beyond repair and diminished their ability to block future reform laws, especially the great Reform Act of 1832. Paradoxically, Wellington's success in forcing through emancipation led many Ultra-Tories to demand reform of Parliament after seeing that the votes of the rotten boroughs had given the government its majority. Thus, it was an ultra-Tory, the Marquess of Blandford, who in February 1830 introduced the first major reform bill, calling for the transfer of rotten borough seats to the counties and large towns, the disfranchisement of non-resident voters, the preventing of Crown office-holders from sitting in Parliament, the payment of a salary to MPs, and the general franchise for men who owned property. The ultras believed that a widely based electorate could be relied upon to rally around anti-Catholicism.

Amendment and repeal
Some sections of the act remain in force in the United Kingdom; of these, some remain in force in England, Wales and Scotland, but were repealed with respect to Northern Ireland by the Statute Law Revision (Northern Ireland) Act 1980. The entire act was repealed in Ireland by the Statute Law Revision Act 1983.

See also 
 Papists Act 1778
 Roman Catholic Relief Act 1791
 Ultra-Tories

Notes

Further reading
 Davis, Richard W. (Spring 1997). "Wellington and the 'Open Question': The Issue of Catholic Emancipation, 1821–1829". Albion. 19#1 pp. 39–55. .
 Davis, Richard W. (February 1999). "The House of Lords, the Whigs and Catholic Emancipation 1806–1829". Parliamentary History. 18#1 pp. 23–43. .
 Gash, Norman (1961). Mr Secretary Peel: The Life of Sir Robert Peel to 1830. London: Longmans, Green. . pp. 545–598. Chapter 16 "Catholic Emancipation" (2011 Faber Finds E-book edition) at Google Books.
 Jenkins, Brian (1988). Era of Emancipation: British Government of Ireland, 1812–1830. Kingston, Ont.: McGill-Queen's University Press. . .
 Kingon, Suzanne T. (November 2004). "Ulster opposition to Catholic emancipation, 1828–9". Irish Historical Studies. 34.134: 137–155. .
 Linker, R. W. (April 1976). "The English Roman Catholics and Emancipation: The Politics of Persuasion". Journal of Ecclesiastical History. 27#2: 151–180. .
 Machin, G. I. T. (March 1979). "Resistance to Repeal of the Test and Corporation Acts, 1828". Historical Journal. 22#1 pp. 115–139. .

External links 
 
 The text of the act
 Catholic Emancipation (Article by Marjie Bloy, August 2002)

Anti-discrimination legislation
Anti-discrimination law in the United Kingdom
United Kingdom Acts of Parliament 1829
Constitutional laws of the United Kingdom
British constitutional laws concerning Ireland
1829 in Ireland
Christianity and law in the 19th century
Catholic Church in the United Kingdom
Law about religion in the United Kingdom
1829 in Christianity
April 1829 events
Anti-Catholicism in the United Kingdom